Mamnoon is an Asian masculine given name. Notable people with the name include:

Mamnoon Hussain (1940–2021), Pakistani businessman and politician
Mamnoon Maqsoodi (born 1966), Afghan actor

Asian given names
Masculine given names